Johann Erasmus Kindermann (29 March 1616 – 14 April 1655) was a German Baroque organist and composer. He was the most important composer of the Nuremberg school in the first half of the 17th century.

Life
Kindermann was born in Nuremberg and studied music from an early age; at 15 he already had a job performing at Sunday afternoon concerts at the Frauenkirche (he sang bass and played violin). His main teacher was Johann Staden. In 1634/35 the city officials granted Kindermann permission and money to travel to Italy to study new music. Nothing is known about his stay in Italy; he may have visited Venice like several other Nuremberg composers (Hans Leo Hassler, Johann Philipp Krieger). In January 1636 the city council ordered Kindermann back to take the position of second organist of the Frauenkirche. In 1640 he was employed as organist at Schwäbisch-Hall, but quit the same year to become organist of the Egidienkirche, the third most important position of its kind in Nuremberg after St. Sebald and St. Lorenz.

Kindermann stayed in Nuremberg for the rest of his life, and became one of the most famous musicians of the city and its most acclaimed teacher. His pupils included  Augustin Pfleger, and also Heinrich Schwemmer and Georg Caspar Wecker, both of whom tutored the last generation of the Nuremberg school, which included the Krieger brothers and, most importantly, Johann Pachelbel. Kindermann was also instrumental in spreading new music in Nuremberg and south Germany, publishing not only several collections of his own music, but also works by Giacomo Carissimi, Girolamo Frescobaldi and Tarquinio Merula.

Works
Most of Kindermann's surviving works are vocal pieces that reflect the transition from older forms to the more modern use of concertato techniques and basso continuo and explore a variety of techniques from motets for choir without instruments to concertos for solo voices after Schütz's sectional concertos, recitative and dialogue experiments (some of which look up to late Baroque works - for example, by using unprepared dissonance in the recitative Dum tot carminibus for tenor and continuo). Some two hundred songs survive, on diverse texts: homophonic settings of brief poetic texts, songs for one or two voices and continuo with instrumental ritornellos, etc. Several manuscript pieces are important precursors to later church cantatas and belong to the earliest large-scale Nuremberg vocal music to have contrasting solo and choral movements.

Of the keyboard music, Harmonia Organica (1645) is the most important collection, not only in the musical sense but also in the history of music printing, as it is perhaps the earliest engraved German music. It consists of 25 contrapuntal pieces. The first fourteen are preludes, 15-20 measures long, with no imitative idiom present, each starting with all voices together. The first six cover all church modes (one prelude for both authentic and plagal modes); the next six repeat this series transposing it down a fifth. The rest of the pieces of the collection are titled fuga: some are genuine fugues, others are based on chorale melodies and use them in a variety of ways, sometimes one phrase is answering another, other times the second phrase may be used for an interlude, etc. There is one remarkable triple fugue on chorale melodies, and an early example of chorale fugue (i.e. fugue on the first phrase of the chorale melody), a model which would later be extensively used by central German composers and, most importantly, Johann Pachelbel and J.S. Bach. The final piece of Harmonia Organica is a Magnificat setting, which begins and ends with a full-fledged improvisatory, free section. Different verses are treated differently: some as cantus firmus in one of the voices, one as a fugue, one as an echo, etc. Other surviving keyboard music by Kindermann includes a number of dances for the harpsichord.

Kindermann's most important chamber music is perhaps the collection Canzoni, sonatae (1653), which includes one of the earliest, if not the earliest, use of scordatura in Germany. The pieces of the collection may be seen as precursors to Biber's work; all consist of several contrasting sections, as in similar works by Frescobaldi. Much of the other chamber music, for wind and string instruments, is modelled after Staden's pieces. There is also evidence of lost chamber music collections.

References
 Hans Tischler, Willi Apel. "The History of Keyboard Music to 1700". 1972 Indiana University Press. 
 Harold E. Samuel. "Johann Erasmus Kindermann", Grove Music Online, ed. L. Macy. grovemusic.com .

External links

1616 births
1655 deaths
17th-century classical composers
German Baroque composers
German classical composers
German male classical composers
German classical organists
German male organists
Musicians from Nuremberg
Organists and composers in the South German tradition
Pupils of Johann Staden
17th-century male musicians
Male classical organists